Venus Bay is a wide bay and a township on that bay on the east coast of Victoria, Australia. At the  Venus Bay had a population of 944.

The name Venus Bay was given to the bay by a French expedition under Nicholas Baudin. This was apparently after George Bass's trading ship the Venus. (The expedition traded with Bass in Sydney in around 1801.)

The town of Venus Bay is situated on a narrow peninsula of land located 180 km south-east of Melbourne. Originally named Evergreen the town takes its name from the body of water on its western shore.  On the eastern side of the peninsula is Anderson's Inlet, named after the settler Samuel Anderson.

Venus Bay has become a popular holiday retreat for people from Melbourne and is close to other popular South Gippsland tourist spots such as Phillip Island and Wilsons Promontory.  The permanent population hovers just below 1,000, however this can swell into the thousands during holiday periods. The town is split into three 'estates'. The First Estate is home to the only shopping strip in Venus Bay, consisting of a general store, pharmacy, surf shop / hair dresser, cafe, take-away shops, real estate agents, caravan park and a restaurant.  Three of Venus Bay's five surf beaches (Nos. 1, 2 and 3 beaches) are in the First Estate, with the Venus Bay Surf Livesaving Club located at the No. 1 Beach.  This is the only patrolled beach, although during the busy summer period surf patrols regularly make their way up and down the beaches to just beyond No. 5 beach.

The Venus Bay Community Centre is also located in the First Estate and runs a variety of programs and activities and is home to the Community Recycling Op Shop. In addition, the Community Centre runs a summer holiday program for kids and organizes the Summer Beach Shuttle Bus.

The Second Estate is home to Nos. 4 and 5 beaches as well as the popular fishing jetty on Anderson's Inlet. At the edge of the Second Estate is an elevated viewing platform that allows visitors to look out across Anderson's Inlet and view the many kangaroos that call the quiet eastern shores home.

The Third Estate is a sparsely populated and underdeveloped area leading to the tip of the peninsula (Point Smythe). This estate has the Doyle's Road foreshore reserve and the Point Smythe reservation, home to many wandering tracks that lead to secluded beaches on both shores of the peninsula and to the tip at the mouth of Anderson's Inlet.

The Tour de Tarwin is held every Easter and is a joint Venus Bay/Tarwin Lower initiative. Whilst it is a cycling event at heart, everyone including walkers are encouraged to participate.

In recent years the residents of Venus Bay and nearby Tarwin Lower (5 km closer to Melbourne) have fought off developers seeking to drain the environmental wetlands and set up marina and resort developments. Today the fight appears to be strongly in the favour of the local residents.

In 2017, the locals at Venus Bay stated their displeasure over excessive harvesting of the pipi shellfish by daytrippers who came from Melbourne. Some incidents of vandalism were reported from the area. However, the locals urged that the anger was not racially charged, but was a misguided attempt to safeguard the ecological balance of the region by attacking pipi collectors rather than seeking regulatory change from appropriate authorities.

References

External links
www.venusbay.info Tarwin Lower Venus Bay Association
www.venusbay.blogspot.com Venus Bay blog 
http://www.wunderground.com/weatherstation/WXDailyHistory.asp?ID=IVICVENU2 Venus Bay Weather

Coastal towns in Victoria (Australia)
Bays of Victoria (Australia)
Towns in Victoria (Australia)
Shire of South Gippsland